Miss March is a 2009 American comedy film written, starring, and  directed by Trevor Moore and Zach Cregger, stars of the IFC show The Whitest Kids U' Know. The film was released on March 13, 2009. It marks the final on-screen film appearance of Hugh Hefner prior to his death in 2017. It is also the first of only two films directed by Trevor Moore prior to his death in 2021, the second being "The Civil War On Drugs" which was aired in segments in the final season of The Whitest Kids U' Know in 2011.

Plot
Tucker has been a huge fan of the Playboy franchise since finding his friend Eugene's older brother's magazines when he was eight. Eugene and his girlfriend Cindi Whitehall are public speakers on the subject of abstinence. They plan to have sex at an after prom party that Tucker has invited them to. At the party, Eugene is nervous and Tucker gives him several shots of hard alcohol. Eugene falls down the steps into the basement and is in a coma for four years.

Tucker wakes Eugene from the coma with a baseball bat, and they discover that Cindi has become the newest Playboy centerfold. Tucker devises a plan to go cross country to the Playboy Mansion and crash Playboy's annual Birthday bash in order to reunite Eugene with his old girlfriend. Tucker's girlfriend, Candace, also begins hunting him down after an incident where he stabbed her after she bit his gentials during an epileptic seizure while performing fellatio.

In Chicago, they meet up with their old friend, who has become a famous rapper with the MC name of Horsedick dot MPEG. They all hop on board his party bus and begin to trek across the country towards the Playboy Mansion. After an argument between Horsedick and Eugene, Tucker and Eugene are both thrown out of the bus in the middle of nowhere and left to walk the rest of the way. Just as it seems like all hope is lost, a car pulls up with two lesbian women. They make a deal where the boys will drive while the girls are in the back with each other having sex.

They make it to the Mansion only to be stopped by bouncers at the door. Eugene is suspected of being a stalker and is taken into a secure holding area, but not before being spotted by Cindi. Meanwhile, Tucker runs into Hugh Hefner. Hugh and Tucker have a discussion about Tucker's issues, telling Tucker about the first woman he ever fell in love with. Hefner tells Tucker that "there is a bunny in every woman", and that if Tucker can only see the "bunny" in those women, that he's on to something.

Back in the holding area, Cindi comes in to see Eugene. Eugene claims she left him behind and didn't care about him, but Cindi tells Eugene that the money she made modeling and being a Playboy Bunny was sent to help pay for Eugene's hospital bills after his neglectful father wanted to permanently move him into a low-grade hospital. Tucker apologizes and Candace decides to give him another chance.

Eugene runs into Horsedick dot MPEG, who promised to "rip Eugene's face off". After Cindi reveals that Horsedick was born without genitals, his right-hand man realizes that he's never seen MPEG in action with a woman. At that moment, his crew pulls down his pants, showing nothing but two straws where his genitals should be. Horsedick leaves ashamed, and after Eugene and Cindi make up, Hefner lets everyone back in. Eugene and Tucker find themselves in the Mansion's kitchen, and Eugene tells Tucker that Cindi is waiting upstairs for him.

Cast

 Zach Cregger as Eugene Pratt
 Trevor Moore as Tucker Cleigh
 Craig Robinson as Phil aka "Horsedick Dot MPEG"
 Raquel Alessi as Cindi Whitehall
 Molly Stanton as Candace
 Cedric Yarbrough as Doctor
 Hugh Hefner as Himself
 Sara Jean Underwood as Herself
 Betsy Rue as Strawberrius
 Carla Jimenez as Nurse Juanita
 Eve Mauro as Vonka
 Tanjareen Martin as Crystal
 Alex Donnelley as Mrs. Whitehall
 Jen Taylor as Customs Official
 Anthony Jeselnik as Director

Production
Trevor Moore and Zach Cregger were offered the script of Miss March by Fox, and although not initially interested the idea held some appeal and they took it on as a writing exercise and made it their own. They developed the project intentionally without the involvement of Playboy.

Robert Wagner was originally cast as Hugh Hefner and according to Moore and Cregger, he did a great job, but audiences at test screenings did not react positively; audiences already familiar with Hefner from the television series The Girls Next Door did not connect with Wagner. "Tails between their legs," Moore and Cregger took the film to Playboy. Fortunately, Hefner liked what he saw and agreed to take part, as well as getting 2007 Playmate of the Year Sara Jean Underwood to cameo in the film.

Reception

Critical response
Miss March was poorly received by nearly all critics. Rotten Tomatoes reported that only 5% of reviewers gave the film positive reviews, based upon a sample of 81 reviews, which gave an average score of 2.90 out of 10. Its consensus states, "Even by the modest standards of the teen sex comedy genre, the crass, poorly-made Miss March misses the mark."
On Metacritic, the film received a weighted average average score of 7 out of 100 based upon 15 reviews, indicating "overwhelming dislike".

James Berardinelli, an online film critic, wrote about the film, saying, "This is bad. Not bad in a way that it might be fun to see when inebriated. Bad in a way from which only death provides immunity. Forget waterboarding – just show Guantanamo detainees Miss March and they'll say anything."
Tom O'Neil, a critic for the Los Angeles Times, questioned as to whether the film could be the worst of 2009.
CNN critic Tom Charity declared the film the worst of 2009.

For his performance in the film, Playboy founder Hugh Hefner was nominated for a Razzie Award for "worst supporting actor".

Box office
On Miss March'''s opening weekend, the film grossed $2.4 million, which put the film in 10th place of all movies that weekend.
The film grossed $4.54 million at the box office in the United States and Canada.

Home video
The film was released on both Blu-ray and DVD on July 28, 2009.

Retrospective
Moore and Cregger talked about the film several times on their weekly Twitch livestreams (before Moore's death). Cregger has stated he believes they did the best they could with the idea, and although some scenes work, the film was their first attempt at making a movie. Despite that, he is still relatively critical of the final product. Moore on the other hand, stood by the movie, comparing it to their sketch group The Whitest Kids U' Know'' TV series "some parts are funny, some parts aren't." The directors still had a sense of humor about the poor response as they would read the poor reviews and sarcastically remark about the film's quality on livestream.

References

External links
 
 
 
 
 

2009 films
2000s sex comedy films
2000s buddy comedy films
American sex comedy films
Films about virginity
American screwball comedy films
American teen comedy films
American buddy comedy films
American slapstick comedy films
Fox Searchlight Pictures films
2000s comedy road movies
American comedy road movies
Teen sex comedy films
Films about pornography
Films about Playboy
Films about proms
2009 comedy films
2000s English-language films
2000s American films